Edward Bryan Andrews Jr. (October 9, 1914 – March 8, 1985) was an American stage, film and television actor. Andrews was one of the most recognizable character actors on television and films from the 1950s into the 1980s. His stark white hair, imposing build and horn-rimmed glasses added to the type of roles he received, as he was often cast as an ornery boss, a cagey businessman, or other officious types.

Life and career 
Andrews was born in Griffin, Georgia, the son of an Episcopal priest, and grew up in Pittsburgh, Pennsylvania, Cleveland, Ohio and Wheeling, West Virginia. As a child, he attended Pittsburgh's Nixon Theatre and would nab a balcony seat so as to catch a good view of the 'headliners'. At the age of twelve, he did a walk-on in a stock theatre production which featured James Gleason and he was 'hooked' on an acting career.

He attended the University of Virginia, and at age 21, made his stage debut in 1935, progressing to Broadway the same year. During this period, Andrews starred in the short-lived but very well-received military drama So Proudly We Hail in the lead role opposite Richard Cromwell. In 1936, Andrews debuted in the film Rushin' Art. In 1949 he made a brief, uncredited appearance as a neighbor to David Wayne's character in Adam's Rib. However, it was not until 1955 that he appeared in his third film. He was cast as the subversive and corrupt character of Rhett Tanner, head of a knock-them-off political machine, in The Phenix City Story. This was soon followed by roles in other 1950s films, such as The Harder They Fall (1956), These Wilder Years (1956), Tea and Sympathy (1956), Tension at Table Rock (1956), The Unguarded Moment (1956), Hot Summer Night (1957), The Tattered Dress (1957), The Fiend Who Walked the West (1958) and Night of the Quarter Moon (1959).

Films 
While Andrews' film acting career began in earnest in his forties, he appeared much older than he actually was and he was consistently typecast as a grandfatherly type, and thus he is most strongly associated with these roles in later films. Though he often played amiable characters, Andrews was equally adept at portraying sleazy businessman types or uptight bureaucrats and officials.

Andrews appeared in several popular films including Elmer Gantry (1960) in which he was memorable as George F. Babbitt, The Absent-Minded Professor (1961) and Son of Flubber (1963) in both of which he played the Defense Secretary, The Thrill of It All (1963) with Doris Day and James Garner,  Send Me No Flowers (1964) with Doris Day and Rock Hudson, and Avanti! (1972) in which he was a very convincing agent of the State Department. Among his other film credits are The Young Savages (1961), The Young Doctors (1961), Advise & Consent (1962), The Thrill of It All (1963), Good Neighbor Sam (1964), Youngblood Hawke (1964), Kisses for My President (1964), The Glass Bottom Boat (1966); The Trouble with Girls (1969) with Elvis Presley, Tora! Tora! Tora! (1970) as Admiral Harold R. Stark, How to Frame a Figg (1971), The Million Dollar Duck (1971), Now You See Him, Now You Don't (1972), Charley and the Angel (1973), and The Seniors (1978). He played the character of "Grandpa" Howard Baker in John Hughes' film Sixteen Candles (1984). His final appearance in a feature film was in Gremlins (1984).

Television 
Andrews guested on many television series including: Mama, Thriller, Goodyear Television Playhouse, Hands of Mystery, The United States Steel Hour, Justice (1954 series), Cheyenne, The Twilight Zone (in the episodes "Third From the Sun", and "You Drive"), The Real McCoys, The Eleventh Hour, Route 66, Naked City, Gunsmoke, Rawhide, The Untouchables, Bonanza, Alias Smith and Jones, The Wild Wild West, Ironside, The F.B.I., The Beverly Hillbillies, Mr. Novak, Sanford and Son, One Day at a Time, Love American Style, Ellery Queen, The Invaders, Bewitched, Hawaii Five-O, Charlie's Angels, The Rookies, The Alfred Hitchcock Hour, Storefront Lawyers, Sergeant Bilko, The Love Boat, The Andy Griffith Show, Fantasy Island, Three's Company, The Bob Newhart Show and Quincy, M.E..

Andrews was a regular on the ABC series Broadside (1964–1965) as Commander Roger Adrian. He had previously filmed the pilot for the popular series Hazel in the role of George Baxter. His was the only role re-cast when the show went to series; he was replaced by actor Don DeFore. The other cast members (star Shirley Booth, Whitney Blake, and Bobby Buntrock) stayed with the show. 

Andrews played the character of Charley in the 1966 dramatization of Death of a Salesman, and constantly acted throughout the 1970s as Elton Dykstra on The Intruders, Ernest W. Stanley on The Man Who Came to Dinner, Mayor Chrisholm alongside Don Knotts in the film How to Frame a Figg (1971), and Mayor Massey on The Whiz Kid and the Mystery at Riverton. In 1968, he played a safecracker in a 4-part episode of I Dream of Jeannie and later, in early 1969, he was a drug-dealing mortician on Mod Squad. He also had the lead role as Harry Flood in the NBC short-lived series Supertrain (1979). In 1982, he guest starred as Jack Tripper's (John Ritter) grandfather in an episode of ABC's Three's Company.

In the late 1970s and early 80s, Andrews appeared in a series of popular commercials for Bell Telephone as an overbearing executive who went around the office extolling the increased productivity from then cutting-edge communication technologies like telemarketing, WATS lines, faxes and conference calls.

Personal life 

Andrews' Broadway career was interrupted by military service during World War II. He served as Captain and commanding officer of "Battery C" within the 751st Field Artillery Battalion of the United States Army and was awarded the Bronze Star Medal in September 1945.

Andrews married Emily Barnes in 1955. They had two daughters, Abigail and Tabitha, and a son, Edward III. Andrews was an avid yachtsman.

Elizabeth Montgomery chose the name for her TV daughter "Tabitha" on Bewitched after Andrews' daughter: "The name was my idea," she explained. "I loved it, because it was so old-fashioned. I got it from one of the daughters of Edward Andrews, the actor. The two Andrews girls are named Tabitha and Abigail."

Death 
On March 8, 1985, Andrews suffered a heart attack at his home in Pacific Palisades. He was transported to Santa Monica Hospital where he died later that day. A memorial service for Andrews was held at the St. Matthew's Episcopal Church in Pacific Palisades on March 11.

Andrews was later cremated.

Filmography 

The Phenix City Story (1955) – Rhett Tanner
The Harder They Fall (1956) – Jim Weyerhause
These Wilder Years (1956) – Leland G. Spottsford
Tea and Sympathy (1956) – Herb Lee
Tension at Table Rock (1956) – Kirk
Friendly Persuasion (1956) – Soldier (uncredited)
The Unguarded Moment (1956) – Mr. Bennett
Three Brave Men (1956) – Mayor Henry L. Jensen
Hot Summer Night (1957) – Deputy Lou Follett
The Tattered Dress (1957) – Lester Rawlings
Trooper Hook (1957) – Charlie Travers
The Fiend Who Walked the West (1958) – Judge Parker
Night of the Quarter Moon (1959) – Clinton Page
Elmer Gantry (1960) – George F. Babbitt
The Absent Minded Professor (1961) – Defense Secretary
The Young Savages (1961) – R. Daniel Cole
Love in a Goldfish Bowl (1961) – Sen. Clyde Holloway
The Young Doctors (1961) – Jim Bannister
Advise & Consent (1962) – Senator Orrin Knox
40 Pounds of Trouble (1962) – Herman
Son of Flubber (1963) – Defense Secretary
The Thrill of It All (1963) – Gardiner Fraleigh
The Man from Galveston (1963) – Alonzo Hyde
A Tiger Walks (1964) – Governor Robbins
The Brass Bottle (1964) – Prof. Kenton
Good Neighbor Sam (1964) – Mr. Burke
Kisses for My President (1964) – Sen. Walsh
Send Me No Flowers (1964) – Dr. Ralph Morrissey
Youngblood Hawke (1964) – Quentin Judd
Fluffy (1965) – Griswald
The Glass Bottom Boat (1966) – Gen. Wallace Bleecker
Birds Do It (1966) – Gen. Smithburn
The Hardy Boys: The Mystery of the Chinese Junk (1967) – Dr. Montrose
The Trouble with Girls (1969) – Johnny
Tora! Tora! Tora! (1970) – Admiral Harold R. Stark
How to Frame a Figg (1971) – Mayor Robert Chisholm
The Million Dollar Duck (1971) – Morgan
Now You See Him, Now You Don't (1972) – Mr. Sampson
Avanti! (1972) – J.J. Blodgett
Charley and the Angel (1973) – Ernie, Banker
Wilbur and Orville: The First to Fly (1973)
The Photographer (1974) – Sgt. Sid Collins
The Seniors (1978) – The Banker
Sixteen Candles (1984) – Howard Baker
Gremlins (1984) – Mr. Roland Corben (final film role)

References

External links 

 
 
 

1914 births
1985 deaths
20th-century American male actors
American male film actors
American male stage actors
American male television actors
Male actors from Georgia (U.S. state)
People from Griffin, Georgia
University of Virginia alumni
American Episcopalians